The Drifter is a 1944 American Western film directed by Sam Newfield and written by Patricia Harper. The film stars Buster Crabbe, Al St. John, Carol Parker, Jack Ingram, Jimmy Aubrey and Slim Whitaker. The film was released on June 14, 1944, by Producers Releasing Corporation.

Plot

Cast          
Buster Crabbe as Billy Carson / Drifter Davis
Al St. John as Fuzzy Q. Jones 
Carol Parker as Sally Dawson
Jack Ingram as Dirk Trent
Jimmy Aubrey as Sheriff Perkins
Slim Whitaker as Marshal Hodges
Ray Bennett as Simms
Kermit Maynard as Jack
Roy Brent as Sam 
George Chesebro as Blackie

See also
The "Billy the Kid" films starring Buster Crabbe: 
 Billy the Kid Wanted (1941)
 Billy the Kid's Round-Up (1941)
 Billy the Kid Trapped (1942)
 Billy the Kid's Smoking Guns (1942)
 Law and Order (1942) 
 Sheriff of Sage Valley (1942) 
 The Mysterious Rider (1942)
 The Kid Rides Again (1943)
 Fugitive of the Plains (1943)
 Western Cyclone (1943)
 Cattle Stampede (1943)
 The Renegade (1943)
 Blazing Frontier (1943)
 Devil Riders (1943)
 Frontier Outlaws (1944)
 Valley of Vengeance (1944)
 The Drifter (1944) 
 Fuzzy Settles Down (1944)
 Rustlers' Hideout (1944)
 Wild Horse Phantom (1944)
 Oath of Vengeance (1944)
 His Brother's Ghost (1945) 
 Thundering Gunslingers (1945)
 Shadows of Death (1945)
 Gangster's Den (1945)
 Stagecoach Outlaws (1945)
 Border Badmen (1945)
 Fighting Bill Carson (1945)
 Prairie Rustlers (1945) 
 Lightning Raiders (1945)
 Terrors on Horseback (1946)
 Gentlemen with Guns (1946)
 Ghost of Hidden Valley (1946)
 Prairie Badmen (1946)
 Overland Riders (1946)
 Outlaws of the Plains (1946)

References

External links
 

1944 films
American Western (genre) films
1944 Western (genre) films
Producers Releasing Corporation films
Films directed by Sam Newfield
American black-and-white films
1940s English-language films
1940s American films